The men's pommel horse competition was one of eight events for male competitors in artistic gymnastics at the 1980 Summer Olympics in Moscow. The qualification and final rounds took place on July 20, 22 and 25 at the Luzhniki Palace of Sports. There were 65 competitors from 14 nations, with nations competing in the team event having 6 gymnasts while other nations could have to up to 3 gymnasts. The event was won by Zoltán Magyar of Hungary, the third man to successfully defend an Olympic title in the pommel horse. Silver went to Alexander Dityatin, extending the Soviet Union's podium streak in the event to eight Games. Michael Nikolay of East Germany took bronze for the second consecutive Games. Magyar and Nikolay were the sixth and seventh men to earn multiple pommel horse medals.

Background

This was the 15th appearance of the event, which is one of the five apparatus events held every time there were apparatus events at the Summer Olympics (no apparatus events were held in 1900, 1908, 1912, or 1920). Four of the six finalists from 1976 returned: gold medalist Zoltán Magyar of Hungary, bronze medalists Nikolai Andrianov of the Soviet Union and Michael Nikolay of East Germany, and sixth-place finisher Alexander Dityatin of the Soviet Union. Magyar had also won the last three world championships (1974, 1978, and 1979) and was a heavy favorite. The American-led boycott resulted in there being no competitors from either the traditional men's gymnastics power of Japan or the rising power of the United States; the Soviets' dominance this Games would be challenged only by the East Germans and occasional specialists such as Magyar (on the men's side, at least; Romania had a strong women's team).

Brazil made its debut in the men's pommel horse. Hungary made its 13th appearance, tying the United States (absent from the pommel horse event for the first time since the inaugural 1896 Games) for most of any nation.

Competition format

Each nation entered a team of six gymnasts or up to three individual gymnasts. All entrants in the gymnastics competitions performed both a compulsory exercise and a voluntary exercise for each apparatus. The scores for all 12 exercises were summed to give an individual all-around score. These exercise scores were also used for qualification for the apparatus finals. The two exercises (compulsory and voluntary) for each apparatus were summed to give an apparatus score. The top 6 in each apparatus participated in the finals, except that nations were limited to two finalists each; others were ranked 7th through 65th. Half of the preliminary score carried over to the final.

Schedule

All times are Moscow Time (UTC+3)

Results

Sixty-five gymnasts competed in the compulsory and optional rounds on July 20 and 22. The six highest scoring gymnasts advanced to the final on July 25. Each country was limited to two competitors in the final. Half of the points earned by each gymnast during both the compulsory and optional rounds carried over to the final. This constitutes the "prelim" score.

References

Official Olympic Report
www.gymnasticsresults.com
www.gymn-forum.net

Men's pommel horse
Men's 1980
Men's events at the 1980 Summer Olympics